Moczarne  (Mocharne) is a settlement in the administrative district of Gmina Cisna, within Lesko County, Subcarpathian Voivodeship, in south-eastern Poland, close to the border with Slovakia.

References

Moczarne